Universal Hall Pass is a one-person band formed in 2001 by Melissa R. Kaplan, formerly of Splashdown.

Universal Hall Pass's only full-length album, Mercury, was released in 2004, featuring eleven songs. In December, 2006, UHP released a six-song EP entitled Subtle Things, on which Kaplan worked with ex-bandmate Kasson Crooker. Since then, UHP has released a small number of self-produced individual tracks online.

Discography 

Mercury (LP, 2004)
Tutelary Genius
Dragonfly
Misdirected
No One
Katrinah Josephina
Six-Step Dragon
Avatar
Solar/Lunar
Special Agent
Quiet Use Of Charm
Outro

Subtle Things (EP, 2006)

Sally's Song
Cave Radio
Forms of Imprisonment
Avatar (Tragic Chorus Remix)
Dragonfly (Scarce Chaser Remix)
No One (CIFR Remix)

Self-released single tracks
 Ring of Fire
 The Crickets Sing For Anamaria
 Lyra
 Sin Eater
 de-Orbit Burn Equation
 The Skyclimbers (October 21, 2022)

External links 
 
 UHP on MySpace
 UHP on Facebook
 Melissa Kaplan on IMDb
 UHP on Bandcamp
 UHP on SoundCloud

Musical groups established in 2001